The Basílica de Nuestra Señora de los Ángeles (Our Lady of the Angels Basilica) is a Roman Catholic basilica in Costa Rica, located in the city of Cartago and dedicated to the Virgen de los Pardos, officially known as Virgen de los Ángeles (the Lady of the Angels). The basilica was built in 1639 and was partially destroyed by an earthquake. The basilica has since been restored and constitutes a unique mix of colonial architecture as well as 19th-century Byzantine style; the current building dates back to 1939.

The Basilica of Our Lady of the Angels is consecrated to the Virgin of Nuestra Señora de los Ángeles, a small representation of the Virgin Mary carrying the infant Jesus, said to have been discovered by a peasant girl in Cartago. Tradition claims that the little girl found the small statue on a rock and took it home. The next morning she found that the statue was not there but back at the rock, so she took it to the priest and he locked it in a small box. The next morning the statue was back at the rock. During the construction, the church was destroyed by earthquakes so many times, it was finally decided to move it to the location where the statue was found and they were able to finish construction. Many people think that the earthquakes were signs that the Lady of Los Ángeles wanted the basilica built there.

Owing to the dark complexion of the stone statue, she is sometimes affectionately called La Negrita or Reina de Cartago (lit. Queen of Cartago). The original statue is kept in a golden shell inside the basilica. An official decree declared the Virgin of the Angels the official patron of Costa Rica.

In the days leading to August 2, the Basilica is the object of extensive pilgrimage and visitation by over a million believers (estimates range from 1 to 2.5 million people), many of whom walk from different points throughout the country. However, most people join the 22-kilometer walk to the basilica from San José and surrounding communities.  Locally the pilgrimage is known as the Romería and is one of the most enduring of Costa Rican traditions. As a demonstration of their piety, many people choose to crawl part or the complete journey on their hands and knees.

At the basilica they wash themselves and drink the water from the rock on which the statue was found. Scientists have since found this water to be safe to drink even though no filtration or chemicals are used to purify the water.

The basilica is open all day long and it is not uncommon to find several people stopping in for a prayer. In addition people will bring small silver medals shaped like body parts, where the shape represents the body part the pilgrim is concerned about. They leave them in front of "La Negrita" in hope that they will be cured. After a time, these medals are collected and stored.  A selection of some of them can be seen in a museum Museum in the same site.

References

Basilica churches in Central America
Roman Catholic churches in Costa Rica
Buildings and structures in Cartago, Costa Rica
Buildings and structures in Cartago Province
Tourist attractions in Cartago Province
Museums in Costa Rica
Religious museums